is a railway station in the city of Anjō, Aichi, Japan, operated by Meitetsu.

Lines

Station layout
The station has a single side platform for bi-directional traffic. The station is unattended.

Adjacent stations

Station history
Kita Anjō Station was opened on July 1, 1926 as a station on the privately held Hekikai Electric Railway. Hekikai Electric Railway merged with the Meitetsu Group on May 1, 1944. The station has been unattended since March 1967.

Passenger statistics
In fiscal 2017, the station was used by an average of 1,355 passengers daily (boarding passengers only).

Surrounding area
 Anjō Higashi High School

See also
 List of Railway Stations in Japan

References

External links

 Official web page 

Railway stations in Japan opened in 1926
Railway stations in Aichi Prefecture
Stations of Nagoya Railroad
Anjō, Aichi